St Mirren or St. Mirren may refer to:
 Saint Mirin ( – ), Irish monk and missionary also known as Mirren of Benchor (now called Bangor), Merinus, Merryn and Meadhrán
 St Mirren F.C., a professional football team from Paisley, Renfrewshire, Scotland
 St Mirren Park, a football stadium

See also
 Mirren, a surname